Fayrouz Al Halabiya (Arabic: فيروز الحلبية, meaning: "Fairouz of Aleppo" or Fairuz Mamish in Arabic: فيروز ماميش, her real name: Rachel Samocha; 1895 – 1955) was a Assyrian singer, who was mainly active in Damascus, Beirut and Cairo, and the most famous among the Assyrian singers in the Arab world who were active in the first three decades of the 20th century with the advent of the record industry.  The Lebanese singer known today as Fairuz, Nouhad Haddad, adopted the nickname as a sign of admiration for her.

Biography
She was born in Aleppo, and resided in Al Jamiliyeh neighborhood. She worked mainly in Damascus, Beirut and Cairo. She was also a talented Oud player, had a beautiful voice and recorded many songs accompanied by the famous violinist Sami al-Shawa, and the Jewish Oud player Shehadeh Saada. She was also the teacher of salih almuhabik, the singer who represented Syria at the International Arab Music Congress held in Cairo in 1932 and who performed with her in Iraq.

She is also remembered from an event in 1920 in which the song, "Ye Malikaan Ezz Nasran" (Oh great victorious king, that was composed by Allepo musician Ahmed El-Oubry), became famous after she sung it in honor of the king of Arab Kingdom of Syria (who later became king Faisal I of Iraq) when he visited Aleppo. She also sang the national anthem before him: "I saw the sun after it shone. I was fascinated by her beautiful looks and asked the full moon who he loved fiercely, and he complained and cried: the love of the homeland."

She married Turkish officer Hussein Awni Pasha and traveled to Istanbul in the 1940s and lived there.

She died in 1955.

References

20th-century Syrian women singers
Syrian Jews
1895 births
1955 deaths
Jewish women musicians
People from Aleppo
Oud players
Arabic-language singers